Carlos Simão Matsinhe (born October 2, 1954) is a Mozambican Anglican bishop. He is the 11th Anglican bishop of the Lebombo, Mozambique. The second Mozambican-born bishop of Lebombo, he is the symbolic head of the Anglican church in Mozambique. Matsinhe was formerly the dean of Maciene Cathedral, serving for over 15 years. Matsinhe's theology embraces the social tradition within Anglicanism and advocates an active participation of the church in education, health and environmental affairs.

Early life and education
Matsinhe was born in Homoine, Mozambique. He was educated in a nearby Roman Catholic missionary school and subsequently went to Our Lady of the Immaculate Conception College in the city of Inhambane.
Supported by former Bishop Daniel Pina Cabral, from 1975 to 1979, Matsinhe studied theology and trained for priesthood at St. Mark Anglican Seminary in Dar-es-Salaam, which was affiliated to Makerere University one of Africa's oldest higher learning institutions.

Ministry
Matsinhe was made deacon in 1979 while simultaneously working as a translator and time and standards technician at Mabor General, a state owned tyre manufacturing company. On January 6, 1980 he was ordained priest and then became rector to the parish of SS. Stephen and Lawrence, and later dean of St. Augustine's Cathedral, from 1998 to 2014. During his tenure he also acted as a chaplain to the Anglican youth (1981-1987), chaplain to The Mission to Seafarers, a role he remembers with great joy. “That was one of my doors to the world. When a ship arrived I had to be there to welcome the seamen, show them the Post Office...because at that time boats spent long periods docked in the port.” While at St. Stephen and St. Lawrence, Matsinhe and congregation members developed a Street Children Rehabilitation Centre which sought to provide shelter, education and re-integration of street children in society. The centre also trained children in soap-making, sewing, batik, visual arts and lasted nearly 25 years. In the 35 years of work for the diocese, Matsinhe also coordinated a theological exchange program with Brazil, England, Sweden, and the U.S., and represented the Anglican Church of Southern Africa in the 7th General Assembly of the World Council of Churches in Canberra, Australia.

Education career
Matsinhe played a major role in education and is widely regarded has one of the pioneers in the development of the private education sector in post-Marxist Mozambique, to help curb the shortage of college places in the public system. In collaboration with the DanChurchAid, Matsinhe fundraised and coordinated the construction of The Anglican School of St. Cyprian in Maputo. This facility accommodated about 1,500 students a year and catalyzed the creation of a network of private colleges in Maputo. Matsinhe was also central in the creation of the Paulo Mabumo Arts Centre, an arts and craft centre training artisans in embroidery, weaving, dying and making of recycled paper using leaves, bark, roots, petals, and recyclables. Recently he also worked with ALMA London, in the reconstruction of the Maciene primary and secondary school. Since his appointment to Bishop of Lebombo, Matsinhe has turned his focus to the development and construction of a theology school, set to also serve candidates to priesthood from Angola.

Land Law
Former president of the Mozambican Association of Mutual Aid (ORAM), Matsinhe also contributed in the revision and extension of the Land law. Acting as an interlocutor between peasants and the state, promoted accessibility of land and dissemination of information on Land rights and Protection mechanisms. Advocating a non-privatization of the land, ORAM is now proposing a revision of the mining law to ensure transparency and ethics in the exploitation of the vast natural gas reserves resources that the country now sits on.

Bishop of Lebombo
Matsinhe emerged as a candidate to be the next bishop of Lebombo in March 2014, when the Rt. Revd. Dinis Sengulane announced his retirement after leading the church for 38 years. His election as the Bishop of Lebombo took place on August 10, 2014  at St. Augustine's Cathedral after a voting process led by Thabo Makgoba, the Archbishop of Cape Town. Matsinhe was consecrated Bishop of Lebombo on September 28, 2014 at Pavilhão do Maxaquene.

Personal life
Matsinhe is married to Hortência Samuel and together they have five children, Simão, Melita, Samito, Graça and Artur.

References

1954 births
Living people
Mozambican Anglicans
21st-century Anglican bishops in Africa
People from Inhambane Province
Anglican bishops of Lebombo